Mobley's Message is an album by jazz saxophonist Hank Mobley, released on the Prestige label in 1957. It was recorded on July 20, 1956 and features performances by Mobley, Donald Byrd, Barry Harris, Doug Watkins and Art Taylor, with Jackie McLean guesting on one track.

Track listing 
All compositions by Hank Mobley except as indicated

 "Bouncing with Bud" (Powell) - 7:00
 "52nd Street Theme" (Monk) - 5:43
 "Minor Disturbance" - 6:16
 "Au Privave" (Parker) - 7:34
 "Little Girl Blue" (Hart, Rodgers) -  8:44
 "Alternating Current" - 6:34

Personnel 
 Hank Mobley - tenor saxophone
 Donald Byrd - trumpet - except track 5
 Barry Harris - piano
 Doug Watkins - bass
 Art Taylor - drums
 Jackie McLean - alto saxophone (#4 only)

References 

Hard bop albums
Hank Mobley albums
1957 albums
Prestige Records albums
Albums recorded at Van Gelder Studio